Bruce Rowland (born 9 May 1942 in Melbourne) is an Australian composer.

Biography

Rowland composed the soundtrack for the 1982 movie The Man from Snowy River, as well as the soundtrack for its 1988 sequel The Man from Snowy River II (which has the United States title of Return to Snowy River, and the United Kingdom title of The Untamed).  Both films were based on Banjo Paterson's poem The Man from Snowy River. 

His other film scores include Now and Forever (1983), Phar Lap (1983), Bushfire Moon (1987), Cheetah (1989), Weekend with Kate (1990), Gross Misconduct (1993), Andre (1994), Lightning Jack (1994), Zeus and Roxanne (1997) and the TV movie Tidal Wave: No Escape (1997).

He composed a special Olympics version of the main theme of The Man from Snowy River Suite, as well as conducting the orchestra, for the Opening Ceremony of the 2000 Summer Olympics which were held in Sydney, New South Wales, Australia.

He also composed special arrangements of some of his music for the 2002 musical theatre production "The Man from Snowy River: Arena Spectacular", which twice toured Australian capital cities.  The original cast album of the show won the ARIA Award for Best Cast / Show Album). Rowland also composed new music for "The Australian Outback Arena Show" on Queensland's Gold Coast.

Rowland composed the music to the Oscar nominated animation The Mysterious Geographic Explorations of Jasper Morello (2005).

NBC Sports also uses some of the music from The Man from Snowy River soundtrack for their coverage of The Players Championship.

Some of his early work was in television, where he was musical director for ATV0's The Go!! Show, Fredd Bear's Breakfast-A-Go-Go and the Magic Circle Club, then Adventure Island for the ABC.

Rowland received his education at Caulfield Grammar School in his hometown. He learned piano and was a keyboard player for Australian music groups, and singers.

He played drums on Shawn Phillips's Second Contribution album, published in 1970.

Discography

Charting albums

Awards
Awards won by Bruce Rowland

1982
 Won the AFI Award for Best Score for The Man from Snowy River

1983
 Won the AFI Award for Best Score for Phar Lap
 Won the Penguin Award for Best Score for All the Rivers Run

1984
 Won the Australasian Performing Rights Association Award for Best Score for The Man from Snowy River

1985
 Won the AFI Award for Best Score for Rebel
 Won the Australasian Performing Rights Association Award for Best Score for The Man from Snowy River
 Won the Australasian Performing Rights Association Award for Best Score for Phar Lap

1989
 Won the Australasian Performing Rights Association Award for Best Score for The Man from Snowy River (Return to Snowy River)

2005
 Won the Australasian Performing Rights Association Award for Best Score for The Mysterious Geographic Explorations of Jasper Morello
 Awarded the APRA/AGSC 'International Achievement Award'

ARIA Music Awards
The ARIA Music Awards is an annual awards ceremony that recognises excellence, innovation, and achievement across all genres of Australian music. They commenced in 1987. 

! 
|-
| 1989
| The Man from Snowy River II
| Best Original Soundtrack, Cast or Show Album
| 
| 
|-

See also
 List of Caulfield Grammar School people

References

External links
Bruce Rowland Official Website

Bruce Rowland Interview NAMM Oral History Library (2017)

APRA Award winners
Australian film score composers
Male film score composers
The Man from Snowy River
People educated at Caulfield Grammar School
Living people
1942 births
Varèse Sarabande Records artists
Musicians from Melbourne